Kinesin-like protein KIF3A is a protein that in humans is encoded by the KIF3A gene.

Function 
KIF3A is one subunit of the heterotrimeric motor protein, kinesin-2, that was initially isolated from sea urchin egg/embryo cytosol using microtubule affinity purification. This motor consists of two kinesin-related subunits (called KIF3A and KIF3B or 3C in vertebrates) and an associated protein (KAP3), and it transports protein complexes, nucleic acids and organelles towards the "plus" ends of microtubule tracks within cells. Work done in a broad range of eukaryotic cells has revealed that heterotrimeric kinesin-2 is the primary motor protein driving the intraflagellar transport of tubulins and other axonemal building blocks from the base of the ciliary/flagellar axoneme to their site of assembly at the distal tips. This process is required for cilium assembly/maintenance and cilium-based signalling which play key roles in various cell and developmental processes. For example, in vertebrate embryos, kinesin-2 function is required for cilia-dependent nodal flow and the development of left-right asymmetry.

Interactions
KIF3A has been shown to interact with MAP3K10.

References

Further reading